Muhammad Ramadhan Saifullah bin Usman (born 9 December 2000) is a Malaysian professional footballer who plays as a forward for Malaysian Super League club Johor Darul Ta'zim.

Early life 
From a young age, Ramadhan played in the evening with the kampung boys. Then, his parents sent him to go to J-Kids academy since he was 11-12 years old. Around 2015 to 2016, Ramadhan talent began to develop while studying at SMK Bandar Uda Utama.

Club career

Youth 
He was named 'Mencari Ramli 5' program's Most Valuable Player. He had previously played in a friendly in Manchester.

2020 season
Ramadhan is Johor Darul Ta'zim Academy graduate, his managed to make his debut against Pahang in 2020 Malaysia Super League and scored in his debut. He finished his season with 4 goals to his name.

2021 season

Ramadhan scored his first goal in AFC Champions League against Nagoya Grampus. Later that, Ramadhan did not managed score in any league matches during 2021 Malaysia Super League because of his injury problem and receive his treatment and rehabilitation in Barcelona.

International career 
In 2018, Ramadhan was a member of Malaysia's squad for the AFC B-19 tournament in Indonesia.

In March 2022, he was called up to the Malaysia national football team training camp, ahead of friendly matches against the Philippines, Singapore, and Albirex Niigata Singapore.

Career statistics

Notes

References

2000 births
Living people
People from Johor Bahru
Malaysian footballers
Malaysia youth international footballers
Malaysia Super League players
Johor Darul Ta'zim F.C. players
Association football forwards